Duboscquella is a genus of dinoflagellates.

It was named in reference to Octave Duboscq (1868–1943), who was a French zoologist, mycologist and parasitologist.

The genus was circumscribed by Édouard (Pierre Léon) Chatton in Arch. Zool. Exp. Gen. Vol.59 on pages 322-325 in 1920.

References

External links 
 

Dinoflagellate genera